White Man's Burden is a 1995 American drama film about racism, set in an alternative America where the social and economic positions of Black people and White people are reversed. The film was written and directed by Desmond Nakano. The film revolves around Louis Pinnock (John Travolta), a white factory worker, who kidnaps Thaddeus Thomas (Harry Belafonte), a black factory owner for firing him over a perceived slight.

The title is a well-known phrase inspired by the famous poem of the same title by Rudyard Kipling.

Plot
At dinner, wealthy black CEO Thaddeus Thomas discusses white people and claims they are "genetically inferior" because their children grow up without fathers.

Trying to improve himself, white candy factory worker Louis Pinnock offers to deliver a package to Thomas after his shift. Pinnock is let into the property by a white servant at the security gate point in front of the Thomas residence and accidentally views Thomas's wife naked through the window. Thomas notices and complains to the VP at the factory, during a dinner engagement at his house, that he would prefer a different delivery man instead of a "Peeping Tom". Although Thomas does not suggest any form of punishment towards Pinnock, the VP "gets the message" and immediately fires Pinnock. Pinnock returns to the Thomas residence in an attempt to discuss the misunderstanding with Thomas, but because Thomas is in an important business meeting, he refuses and sends a message to Pinnock that he apologizes, but there is nothing that he can do to help him. Pinnock begs for two minutes of his time, but is turned away.

Without any education, connections or advanced skills, Pinnock finds difficulty getting a job and is unable to support his family. The Pinnock family are awakened one early morning by the police and the landlord to enforce eviction; the family struggles to gather their important belongings as they vacate the premises. Pinnock's mother-in-law scolds him for failing as a man; she says there is not enough room for him at her house where his wife and two children are going.

Pinnock's truck breaks down and he is forced to walk. At night, Pinnock is apprehended by the police who mistake him for a bank robber because "he fit the description". The people inside a bar come outside and shout at the police, demanding that they leave Pinnock alone. People gathering outside the bar begin throwing bottles at the police. Pinnock is beaten by the police but they are chased away by the angry mob.

In a quest for justice, Pinnock kidnaps Thomas at gunpoint and demands a large sum of money that he believes is owed him for losing his job. After multiple failed attempts to withdraw the money, Pinnock holds Thomas hostage for the weekend and takes him through the ghetto where he lives. Thomas, however, remains unsympathetic to Pinnock and calls him a failure who blames the world for his problems. But Pinnock takes Thomas through the ghetto anyway into an abandoned building and Thomas alternates between enjoying some of the staples of ghetto life and having his eyes open to this world's racism. Thomas has a heart attack and Pinnock does CPR on Thomas and does not respond, Pinnock drives the truck, but the truck breaks down on the street. Pinnock shoots the store windows to get the police's attention to aid Thomas in his breathing problems but is mistakenly shot and killed because the police assume he is armed.

The chastened CEO visits Pinnock's grieving widow and offers her the money that Louis requested. She refuses it, and when Thomas awkwardly asks if she wants more, she bluntly says "How much would ever be enough?" and closes the door in his face.

Cast
John Travolta as Louis Pinnock
Harry Belafonte as Thaddeus Thomas
Kelly Lynch as Marsha Pinnock
Margaret Avery as Megan Thomas
Tom Bower as Stanley
Andrew Lawrence as Donnie Pinnock
Bumper Robinson as Martin
Tom Wright as Lionel
Sheryl Lee Ralph as  Roberta
Judith Drake as Dorothy
Robert Gossett as John
Wesley Thompson as Williams
Tom Nolan as Johansson
Willie C. Carpenter as Marcus
Michael Beach as a policeman
Carrie Snodgress as Josine

Reception

Critical response
The film gained a negative reception from critics. It holds a 24% rating on Rotten Tomatoes based on 33 reviews. Audiences surveyed by CinemaScore gave the film a grade of "C" on scale of A+ to F.

A "D" score was awarded to the film by Owen Gleiberman of Entertainment Weekly.

Stephen Holden of The New York Times wrote "Were it not for John Travolta's big-hearted portrayal of an unemployed white factory worker driven to commit a desperate act, the movie would be an emotionally frozen exercise in cautious high-mindedness".

Rolling Stones Peter Travers accused the film of "spiral[ing] into tragedy but never into stirring drama".

Box office
The film was not a box office success, though the very small budget meant its losses were also minimal; it was widely seen as a blip on the radar during John Travolta's massive comeback as a film star during the post-Pulp Fiction phase of his career.

The film grossed $3.7 million in the US and Canada and an estimated $9 million worldwide.

Soundtrack

A soundtrack album to the film was released on November 7, 1995.

Track listing 
 Blues Traveler - "Regarding Steven" (John Popper) - 4:44
 Hootie & the Blowfish - "Dream Baby" (Cindy Walker) - 2:59
 Changing Faces - "We Got It Goin' On" - 3:04
 Me'shell Ndegeocello - "Time Has Come Today" (Joseph Chambers/Willie Chambers) - 6:01
 Dave Matthews Band - "Tripping Billies" (Dave Matthews) - 4:14
 Cracker - "How Can I Live my Life Without You" (Johnny Hickman/David Lowery) - 3:34
 Bush - "Broken TV" (Gavin Rossdale) - 3:42
 Meat Puppets - "Animal" (Curt Kirkwood) - 4:31
 Howard Shore - "The Burden" - 4:11
 Howard Shore - "The Hymn" - 2:29

See also
Fable - a 1965 TV play about similar subject matter.
BabaKiueria - a 1986 Australian mockumentary about an oppressed white minority in a society dominated by Aboriginal Australians.
Lion's Blood - a 2002 alternate history novel about an alternate world where an Islamic Africa is the center of technological progress and learning while Europe remains largely tribal and backward. 
Noughts and Crosses - a 2020 television series, based on the novels by Malorie Blackman, about similar subject matter.

References

External links

1995 directorial debut films
1995 drama films
1995 films
African-American drama films
American alternate history films
Films about race and ethnicity
Films produced by Lawrence Bender
Films scored by Howard Shore
A Band Apart films
Rysher Entertainment films
Savoy Pictures films
Works about White Americans
1990s English-language films
Films about racism
1990s American films